William Engesser (February 21, 1939 – June 20, 2002)1 was an American film actor and stood 7' 3" tall. His roles include Jerry Reed's bodyguard in Gator (1976), Richard/"Bigfoot" in The Secrets of Isis (1975), Krakow the Werewolf in the campy House on Bare Mountain (1962), and a bit part as a man in a gym in The Nutty Professor (1963).

He attended El Monte High School in El Monte, California. In high school, he was a highly scouted basketball recruit and was often linked with Wilt Chamberlain due to his height. He eventually ended up playing for the University of Southern California but only played in four games during the 1958–1959 season, scoring two points.

References
1. William Engesser. Internet Movie Database. Retrieved February 22, 2010.

2. Bill Engesser, https://www.sports-reference.com/cbb/players/bill-engesser-1.html

3. Stars & Stripes Newspaper

External links

American male film actors
1939 births
2002 deaths
20th-century American male actors